Church of Holy Apostles Peter and Paul was a Serbian Orthodox church located in Suva Reka, city and seat of the eponymous municipality in central Kosovo and Metohija. The church was built in 1938, and it belonged to the Diocese of Raška and Prizren of the Serbian Orthodox Church.

Upon arrival of the German KFOR troops in the area of Suva Reka in June 1999, and when Albanians took over administration of the town, the church was vandalized and looted. In the early morning on 19 July 1999 the church was destroyed by powerful explosives. Local Albanians built a parking lot in the courtyard of the former church.

References

Further reading

External links
 Списак уништених и оскрнављених цркава на Косову и Метохији јун-октобар 1999) ("The list of destroyed and desecrated churches in Kosovo and Metohija June–October 1999") 

Serbian Orthodox church buildings in Kosovo
Destroyed churches in Kosovo
20th-century Serbian Orthodox church buildings
Churches completed in 1938
Suva Reka
Cultural heritage of Kosovo